World Ocean Day (acronym: WOD) is an international day that takes place annually on 8 June. The concept was originally proposed in 1992 by Canada's International Centre for Ocean Development (ICOD) and the Ocean Institute of Canada (OIC) at the Earth Summit – UN Conference on Environment and Development (UNCED) in Rio de Janeiro, Brazil. The Ocean Project started global coordination of World Ocean Day starting in 2002.  "World Oceans Day" was officially recognised by the United Nations in 2008. The international day supports the implementation of worldwide Sustainable Development Goals (SDGs) and fosters public interest in the protection of the ocean and the sustainable management of its resources.

History

1987–1992 
The Brundtland Commission (also known as the World Commission on Environment and Development) noted in the 1987 Brundtland Report that the ocean sector lacked a strong voice compared to other sectors.

At the first World Ocean Day in 1992, the objectives were to move the ocean from the sidelines to the center of the intergovernmental and NGO discussions and policy and to strengthen the voice of ocean and coastal constituencies worldwide.

2002–2008 
Globally coordinated efforts began with The Ocean Project and the World Ocean Network collaborating, and events numbered in the dozens. During this time, www.WorldOceanDay.org launched, to help promote the opportunity to raise the profile of the ocean and provide opportunities for getting involved and making a difference for our blue planet.  The website provides event organizers with ways to help in their communities, and generates global involvement through the dissemination of educational and actionable resources, ideas, and tools, always free for everyone to use to celebrate World Ocean Day in whatever way they choose. In 2004, The Ocean Project and World Ocean Network launched the "Help Make a Difference for our Ocean Planet!" with both online and in person opportunities to sign a petition to the United Nations to officially recognize 8 June as World Ocean Day. In December 2008, the UN General Assembly passed a Declaration to officially recognise the Day.

Annual themes

Overview 
The United Nations selected the following annual themes for the Day:
2009: "Our Oceans, Our Responsibilities"
2010: "Our Oceans: Opportunities and Challenges"
2011: "Our Oceans: greening our future"
2012: "UNCLOS @ 30" — United Nations Convention on the Law of the Sea (UNCLOS)
2013: "Oceans & People"
2014: "Ocean Sustainability: Together let's ensure oceans can sustain us into the future"
2015: "Healthy Oceans, Healthy Planet"
2016: "Healthy Oceans, Healthy Planet ⁠— Voyaging to a Sustainable Planet: Arrival of the Hōkūle‘a"
2017: "Our Oceans, Our Future"
2018: "Clean our Ocean!"
2019: "Gender and Oceans"
2020: "Innovation for a Sustainable Ocean"
2021: "The Ocean: Life & Livelihoods"
2022: "Revitalization: Collective Action for the Ocean"

2008 
The Ocean Project and World Ocean Network launched an annual theme for first time: "Helping our climate / helping our ocean" with a special focus on coral reefs, to help support International Year of the Reef.

2009-2010  
Continued and more heavily emphasized on climate with conservation action theme of "one ocean, one climate, one future" because comprehensive polling work showed that the public not making the connections between climate change and ocean health.

2010 
The Ocean Project and World Ocean Network recorded over 300 events for WOD 2010, a 26% increase over 2009. Participation in the United States increased by 32% (with participation in 37 states, as compared to 25 states the previous year). Forty-five countries participated in World Oceans Day 2010, including Bangladesh, Belgium, French Polynesia, Nigeria, Ghana, Kenya, Malta, Malaysia, Venezuela, and Portugal.

2011-2012  
Based on growing requests from around the world for a two-year focus, The Ocean Project and World Ocean Network launched "Youth: the Next Wave for Change" encouraging all participating organizations to more effectively engage young people in their communities and countries for education and action.

2013  
"Make a Promise" global campaign focused again on supporting organizations to use World Oceans Day events as opportunities to ask people in their communities or target audiences to take action for our shared ocean.

2014 
Through the global World Ocean Day network, stepped up involvement on the major issues facing the ocean, and launched "Together We Have the Power to Protect the Ocean!" with action guides on renewable energy/climate change, sustainable seafood/fisheries, plastics action. Events registered on the World Ocean Day website numbered in the hundreds. The United Nations together with partners launched the annual amateur World Oceans Day Oceanic Photo Competition.

2015-2019  
In solidarity with the annual UN themes, The Ocean Project launched a five-year Conservation Action Focus on plastic pollution prevention and helping with solutions for a healthy world ocean. The World Ocean Day Youth Advisory Council launched in 2016, and current cohort includes 25 diverse young leaders (ages 15–23) from 22 countries. Annual Reports since 2016 can be viewed here.

2020 
The UN theme for World Oceans Day was 'Innovation for a sustainable ocean'. Conservation Action Focus on protecting 30% of our lands and ocean by 2030 ("30x30"), joining with the Campaign for Nature and the growing global movement to petition world leaders to commit their countries to 30x30. The Ocean Project and National Geographic coordinated a first-ever 24-hour Youth-a-thon for the ocean, with 24 co-hosts from 24 major time zones discussing and demonstrating ways to learn more about and help protect our shared blue planet. The World Ocean Day 2020 Annual Report can be viewed here.

2021 
The theme for World Oceans Day in 2021 was'The Ocean: Life & Livelihoods'. The aim of this year's campaign was to "shed light on the wonder of the ocean and how it is our life-source, supporting humanity and every other organism on Earth".
The conservation action focus for World Ocean Day 2021 focused for a second year on protecting 30% of our lands and ocean by 2030 ("30x30"), joining with the Campaign for Nature and the growing global movement to petition world leaders to commit their countries to 30x30. There were more than 1,000 events from 150 countries registered on the website and the World Ocean Day 2021 Annual Report can be viewed here.

2022
The theme for World Oceans Day in 2022 is Revitalization: Collective Action for the Ocean. The campaign was promoted on social media. Its purpose was to raise awareness and action against the consequences of human activity on the ocean’s health, as 95% of the ocean’s surface has become more acidic since the late 1980s. The acidification of the oceans is dangerous to the marine ecosystem and affects more than three billion people who depend on the oceans for income and diet.

See also

 Coral Triangle Day
 European Maritime Day
 Marine pollution
 Ocean governance
 Overfishing
 Plastic pollution
 Spaceship Earth

References

External links

  Official United Nations World Oceans Day Website
  Official United Nations World Oceans Day Website (2009–2017)

1992 introductions
Environmental awareness days
June observances
Oceans
United Nations days